Wuliji Buren ( born March 1, 1990) is a Chinese mixed martial artist who competed in the Bantamweight division of the Ultimate Fighting Championship.

Background

Starting out as a Shuai jiao, wrestler, Wuliji Buren competed in the China National Shuai jiao Tournament, where he took third place. After watching UFC for years, in 2013 he retired from the wrestling team and made the decision to do MMA.

Mixed martial arts career

Early career
In the beginning of his mixed martial arts career, Wuliji fought primarily in Chinese regional scene. After racking up a record of 9–4, he fought for the Chin Woo Men MMA Professional League Featherweight Championship, which he won in the finals with a submission win over Ye Yuan.

Ultimate Fighting Championship

In his UFC debut, Wuliji Buren faced Rolando Dy in UFC Fight Night: Bisping vs. Gastelum on November 25, 2017. At the weigh-ins, Dy weighed in at 148 lbs., two pounds over the featherweight limit. As a result, he forfeited 20% of his purse to Buren and the bout was fought at a catchweight. Wuliji lost the fight by unanimous decision.

Wuliji faced Marlon Vera on August 8, 2018 at UFC 227. He lost the fight via TKO in the second round.

His next fight came on February 9, 2019 at UFC 234 against Jonathan Martinez. He lost the fight via unanimous decision.

After his third straight loss and inactivity of almost a year, Wuliji Buren was released from the UFC in January 2020.

Road to UFC 

After his release from the UFC, Buren returned to the Chinese regional scene, winning his next three bouts via submission; second round shoulder choke against Aleksandr Lunga at WLF W.A.R.S. 39, second round guillotine at WLF W.A.R.S. 41 against Nikolay Kondratuk, and finally first round arm-triangle choke at Huya FC against Lei Yu. He would lose his next bout at WLF MMA 52 against Keremuaili Maimaitituohati via unanimous decision, before rebounding by winning in 29 seconds via flying knee against Akenbieke Ayijiake.

Nakamura faced Shohei Nose in the Quarter-Finals of the Bantamweight tournament on June 9, 2022 in Road to UFC: Episode 4. He lost the bout via TKO due to substaining a knee injury.

Mixed martial arts record

|-
|Loss
|align=center|15–9
|Shohei Nose
|TKO (knee injury)
|Road to UFC: Singapore Episode 4
|
|align=center|1
|align=center|1:13
|Kallang, Singapore
|
|-
| Win
| align=center|15–8
| Akenbieke Ayijiake
| KO (flying knee)
| WKG & M-1: 2021 Harbin Bank Chengdu Charity Tournament
| 
| align=center|1
| align=center|0:29
| Chengdu, China
|
|-
| Loss
| align=center|14–8
| Keremuaili Maimaitituohati
| Decision (unanimous)
| WLF MMA 52
| 
| align=center|3
| align=center|5:00
| Maotai, China
|
|-
| Win
| align=center|14–7
| Lei Yu
| Submission (arm-triangle choke)
| Huya FC 3
| 
| align=center|1
| align=center|2:54
| Zhengzhou, China
| 
|-
| Win
| align=center|13–7
| Nikolay Kondratuk
| Submission (guillotine choke)
| WLF W.A.R.S. 41
| 
| align=center|2
| align=center|2:47
| Zhengzhou, China
|
|-
| Win
| align=center|12–7
| Aleksandr Lunga
| Submission (shoulder choke)
| WLF W.A.R.S. 39
| 
| align=center|2
| align=center|2:45
| Zhengzhou, China
| 
|-
| Loss
| align=center| 11–7
| Jonathan Martinez
|Decision (unanimous)
|UFC 234
|
|align=center|3
|align=center|5:00
|Melbourne, Australia
|
|-
| Loss
| align=center| 11–6
| Marlon Vera
|KO (punch to the body)
|UFC 227 
|
|align=center|2
|align=center|4:53
|Los Angeles, California, United States
|
|-
| Loss
| align=center| 11–5
| Rolando Dy
|Decision (unanimous)
|UFC Fight Night: Bisping vs. Gastelum
|
|align=center|3
|align=center|5:00
|Shanghai, China
|
|-
| Win
| align=center| 11–4
| Ye Yuan
| Submission (guillotine choke)
| Chin Woo Men: 2016-2017 Season Final
| 
| align=center| 1
| align=center| N/A
| Guangzhou, China
| 
|-
| Win
| align=center| 10–4
| Rong Zhu
| Submission (rear-naked choke)
| Chin Woo Men: 2016-2017 Season, Stage 6
| 
| align=center| 1
| align=center| 1:37
| Guangzhou, China
| 
|-
| Win
| align=center| 9–4
| Beno Adamia
| TKO (slam)
| Superstar Fight 7
|  
| align=center| 3
| align=center| 4:26
| Changsha, China
|
|-
| Win
| align=center| 8–4
| Sirozhiddin Eshanbaev
| Submission
| Glory of Heroes: Conquest of Heroes 1
| 
| align=center| 2
| align=center| N/A
| Jiyuan, China
|
|-
| Loss
| align=center|7–4
| Dong Gyu Kim
| Decision (split)
| Art of War 18
| 
| align=center| 2
| align=center| 5:00
| Beijing, China
|
|-
| Win
| align=center|7–3
| Roman Lutsenko
| Decision (unanimous)
| WLF E.P.I.C. 4
| 
| align=center| 3
| align=center| 5:00
| Zhengzhou, China
|
|-
| Loss
| align=center|6–3
| Musa Kazikhanov
| Submission (triangle choke)
| Bullet Fly FC 4
| 
| align=center|3
| align=center|0:00
| Beijing, China
|
|-
| Loss
| align=center|6–2
| Alexandros Michailidis
| TKO (punches)
| WLF E.P.I.C. 2
| 
| align=center|1
| align=center|1:30
| Zhengzhou, China
|
|-
| Loss
| align=center| 6–1
| Chengjie Wu
| Submission (armbar)
| WBK 4: Battle of Kings
| 
| align=center|1
| align=center|2:45
| Ningbo, China
| 
|-
| Win
| align=center| 6–0
| Ali El Ezzabi
| Decision (split)
| Kunlun Fight 12
|
| align=center| 3
| align=center| 5:00
|Jianshui, China
|
|-
| Win
| align=center| 5–0
| Chang Xin Fu
| Submission (rear-naked choke)
| Chinese Kung Fu Championships
| 
| align=center| 1
| align=center| 0:00
| Qian'an, China
|
|-
| Win
| align=center| 4–0
| Xiaolong Bai
| Decision (unanimous)
| Chinese Kung Fu Championships
| 
| align=center| 3
| align=center| 3:00
| Qian'an, China
| 
|-
| Win
| align=center| 3–0
| Wulalibieke Baheibieke
| Submission (armbar)
| Chinese Kung Fu Championships
| 
| align=center| 2
| align=center| 1:09
| Qian'an, China
| 
|-
| Win
| align=center| 2–0
| Chunbo Yuan
| TKO (punches)
| RUFF 13
| 
| align=center| 1
| align=center| 1:26
| Shanghai, China
|
|-
| Win
| align=center| 1–0
| Nannan He
| Decision (unanimous)
| RUFF 12
| 
| align=center| 3
| align=center| 5:00
| Shanghai, China
|

See also 
 List of current UFC fighters
 List of male mixed martial artists

References

External links 
  
 

1990 births
Living people
Chinese male mixed martial artists
People from Chifeng
Sportspeople from Inner Mongolia
Bantamweight mixed martial artists
Mixed martial artists utilizing Shuai Jiao
Ultimate Fighting Championship male fighters